Hemitragus is a genus of bovids that currently contains a single living species, the Himalayan tahr. Two extinct species are also known from the Pleistocene.

The Arabian tahr and Nilgiri tahr were once included in Hemitragus but have since been assigned to their own genera.

References

Mammal genera
Mammal genera with one living species
Taxa named by Brian Houghton Hodgson
Caprids